Anne Lysbeth Noble  (born 1954) is a New Zealand photographer and Distinguished Professor of Fine Art (Photography) at Massey University's College of Creative Arts. Her work includes series of photographs examining Antarctica, her own daughter's mouth, and our relationship with nature.

Education
Born in Whanganui in 1954, Noble attended high school at the Roman Catholic girls' college, Erskine College, in Island Bay, Wellington, and Wanganui Girls' College. She completed a MFA Honours (1st class) at the Elam School of Fine Arts in 1983.

Work
Noble's approach to her work involves "prolonged observation and attentive watching". She is known for working in photographic series. Her first major exhibition, The Wanganui, opened at the Sarjeant Gallery in 1982 and toured to the Museum of New Zealand Te Papa Tongarewa, Auckland, Hamilton and Te Manawa in Palmerston North. Writer Sheridan Keith described these works as "a series of images of immense spirituality, serenity and intensity of feeling".

In the presence of angels – photographs of the contemplative life (1988–1990) is a series of photographs documenting life inside a London convent. Noble lived with the Benedictine nuns in the silent order for an extended period.

In My Father’s Garden is a series of photographs that follow the artist's father's death, while the Hidden Lives series capture the lives of elderly intellectually disabled people and their carers.

The series Ruby’s Room (1998–2007) features close-up images of the photographer's daughter's mouth. The artist says that many of the best childhood moments go unrecorded, and that many of these "relate to pleasures and play around the mouth, moments of defiance and triumph, like managing to blow a really good bubble with bubble gum ... I wanted to magnify the colour, the spontaneity, the life, the fun and play, and all the things that I enjoyed as a mother." In 2010 the Museum of New Zealand Te Papa Tongarewa acquired 30 of the works from the series as a boxed portfolio, describing them as "standing alongside her Antarctic work [as] Anne Noble's major body of photography from the 2000s".

In 2001 the Dunedin Public Art Gallery staged a major retrospective of Noble's work, Anne Noble: States of Grace, which toured to City Gallery Wellington and the Auckland Art Gallery.

Since 2001, Noble has been researching and visiting the Antarctic, and has produced several series of works on this subject, including Antarctica Iceblink and Antarctica Whiteout. These works are often concerned with how Antarctica has been portrayed in popular perceptions, exploring how we have come to see Antarctica as "a glistening white world where penguins frolic and snowflakes fall".

Noble's work has investigated the honeybee and its place in our world, research instigated by her time on a Fulbright fellowship based at Columbia College in Chicago as their international artist in residence. Her first exhibition on this subject, Nature Study, was held at Bartley+Company in Wellington in 2015. Writing about these new works, art historian Priscilla Pitts noted:

For several years Noble has focused her camera on Antarctica, 'the last great wilderness on earth', intractable despite our efforts to document and understand it, yet fragile and susceptible to our actions elsewhere on the planet. Noble's attention to the plight of bees arises from the same concern for the natural environment and what we are doing to it. In these new works there is a shift from the ostensibly documentary mode of the Antarctic images towards a more overtly poetic exploration of her subject, something that is familiar from much of her earlier work.

Noble's work on bees Conversātiō: in the company of bees was published in 2021.

Awards and recognitions
Noble has held several artist residencies, including the Tylee Cottage Residency in 1990, Artist in Residence at the University of Canterbury in 1993, and the Antarctic Arts Fellowship in 2001 and 2009.

She was awarded the US National Science Foundation Artists and Writers Award in 2008 and a Massey University Research Medal in 2009. In 2015 Noble won the 31st Higashikawa Overseas Photographer Award.

In the 2003 Queen's Birthday Honours, Noble was appointed an Officer of the New Zealand Order of Merit, for services to photography. In 2009 she received an Arts Foundation of New Zealand Laureate award. In 2013 Massey University awarded Noble the title of Distinguished Professor.

Publications
 Noble, Anne (1982). The Wanganui: photographs of a river. Auckland [N.Z.]: Photoforum
 Noble, Anne (1989). In the presence of angels  photographs of the contemplative life. Wanganui [N.Z]: Sarjeant Gallery
 
 
 
 
 
 
Noble, Anne; Stanhope, Zara; Brown, Anna (2021). Conversātiō: in the company of bees. Auckland: Massey University Press. ISBN 9780995140752

References

External links
Interview with Anne Noble, Arts on Sunday, Radio New Zealand National, 22 November 2009
Anne Noble interviewed about 'Ice Blink' series, Arts on Sunday, Radio New Zealand National, 19 February 2012
Anne Noble Upbeat, Radio New Zealand National, 13 March 2012
Interview with Anne Noble and Tom Hoyle, Saturday Mornings with Kim Hill, Radio New Zealand National, 20 June 2015
Anne Noble's works at Sarjeant Gallery, Sarjeant Gallery, 16 November 2017
Photographer Anne Noble has a thing about bees, interview on Standing Room Only, Radio New Zealand, 3 October 2021
Massey University staff profile page

1954 births
Living people
New Zealand women photographers
New Zealand artists
New Zealand women artists
New Zealand photographers
Artists from Whanganui
Elam Art School alumni
Officers of the New Zealand Order of Merit
People educated at Erskine College, Wellington
People educated at Whanganui Girls' College
Academic staff of the Massey University